Matthew Miller (born January 13, 1989) is an American rower. He competed in the men's coxless four event at the 2016 Summer Olympics.

References

External links
 

1989 births
Living people
American male rowers
Olympic rowers of the United States
Rowers at the 2016 Summer Olympics
Place of birth missing (living people)